The Ajams was a French automobile, built in Neuilly by M. Ajams in 1920.  A light cyclecar, it had a tubular frame in the "birdcage" style.  Its engine was a 1093 cc water-cooled twin-cylinder 9hp unit with a three-speed gearbox. It also had independent suspension for all for wheels.

References
Georgano, G.N., "Ajams", in G.N. Georgano, ed., The Complete Encyclopedia of Motorcars 1885-1968  (New York: E.P. Dutton and Co., 1974), pp. 230.

See also 
 cyclecar

Cyclecars
Vintage vehicles
Defunct motor vehicle manufacturers of France